SmartSuite is a discontinued office suite from Lotus Software. The company made versions of its office suite for IBM OS/2 and Microsoft Windows.

Status

SmartSuite is no longer supported or maintained.

SmartSuite used to be in maintenance mode, and supported with fixes and fixpacks on Windows 2000 and Windows XP. SmartSuite is not officially supported by IBM on versions of Windows after XP, but it does work very well on both the 32-bit and 64-bit versions of Windows Vista, Windows 7, Windows 8.1,Windows 10 and Windows 11. Install from cd-rom or USB PenDrive with 800mb partition maximum. IBM has no plans to release an official Windows 7-compatible version of SmartSuite.

eComStation 1.0 included the OS/2 version of Smartsuite. It was an optional extra in later versions of eComStation. ArcaOS does not include Smartsuite, but is able to run it.

In 2007, IBM introduced a new office suite called IBM Lotus Symphony, unrelated to the Lotus Symphony integrated application suite that Lotus previously released.

In July 2012 the price for a user licence of Lotus SmartSuite 9.8 was US-$342.00 when purchased directly through the IBM website.

In May 2013, IBM announced the withdrawal of SmartSuite. Marketing of the product ended in June 2013, followed by all support ceasing in September 2014. IBM has also announced that there will be no replacement for SmartSuite.

Components
The following applications are included in SmartSuite for Microsoft Windows:
 Lotus Word Pro — word processor; previously called Ami Pro; .lwp files
 Lotus 1-2-3 — spreadsheet; .123, .wk1, .wk3, .wk4 files
 Lotus Freelance Graphics — presentation software; .prz files
 Lotus Approach — relational database; .apr (data entry and reports), .dbf (database) files
 Lotus Organizer — personal information manager; .org, .or2, .or3 files
 Lotus SmartCenter — a toolbar that let users quickly access programs, calendar, Internet bookmarks, and other resources
 Lotus FastSite — web design software; .htm files
 Lotus ScreenCam — screen recording software for demos and tutorials; .scm, .exe, .wav files
Lotus vCard & vCalendar Viewer — instant vCard and vCalendar viewer

Version history

Microsoft Windows
 (1994) - SmartSuite 2.1 (Ami Pro 3.0, 1-2-3 4.0, Freelance Graphics 2.0, Approach 2.0 and Organizer 1.1)
 (1995) - SmartSuite 3.1 (Windows 3.11) — (Lotus 1-2-3 ver. 5, Approach 3.0, Ami Pro 3.1, Freelance Graphics 2.1, Organizer 2.1, ScreenCam 1.1).
 (1995) - SmartSuite 4.0 (Windows 3.11) - 
 (1996) - SmartSuite 97 — Windows 95 and Windows NT 4.0 (1-2-3 97, Word Pro 97, Approach 97, Freelance Graphics 97, Organizer 97, ScreenCam 4.0 and SmartCenter)
 (1997) - SmartSuite 4.5 (Windows 3.11) - (Word Pro 97 Edition for Windows 3.1.) 
 (1999) - SmartSuite Millennium Edition (9.5) — (Organizer 5.0, Fastsite release 2, WordPro Millennium Edition, 1-2-3 Millennium Edition, Freelance Graphics Millennium Edition, Approach Millennium Edition, SmartCenter and ScreenCam).
 (2002) October 2002: Latest version: SmartSuite Millennium Edition 9.8. 
 Fixpack 2 was the last version provided to the general public.  All subsequent releases were only available to IBM Passport Advantage subscribers.  Fixpack 3 was released in October 2005 and Fixpack 4 in October 2006. A subsequent Fixpack 5 was released in October 2007 followed by Fixpack 6 in December 2008, although these Fixpacks only contained changes to the Lotus Approach database software.

Compatibility

Most SmartSuite programs are capable of reading and writing the corresponding Microsoft Office files. The Microsoft programs, however, are no longer capable of reading formats of the Lotus programs (the latest version that could was 2003).  Furthermore, several of the SmartSuite components provide functionality not found in the Microsoft Office suite, for example Lotus FastSite and Lotus SmartCenter.

IBM vs Microsoft
In his finding of facts in United States v. Microsoft, Judge Jackson determined that because of IBM's marketing of Lotus SmartSuite, and other alternatives to Microsoft products (like World Book electronic encyclopedia instead of Microsoft's Encarta), Microsoft "punished the IBM PC Company with higher prices, a late license for Windows 95, and the withholding of technical and marketing support."

Microsoft did not grant IBM OEM rights for Windows 95 until 15 minutes prior to the release of Windows 95, August 24, 1995. Because of this uncertainty, IBM machines were sold without Windows 95, while Compaq, HP, and other indulgent companies sold machines with Windows 95 from day one.

See also
IBM Lotus Symphony
Lotus Symphony for DOS
Comparison of office suites
Lotus Multi-Byte Character Set (LMBCS)

References

External links
Lotus SmartSuite page
SmartSuite technical forum
The XpertSS - Support for Users of the Lotus SmartSuite
Free viewer for Lotus SmartSuite products (EXE)
Fix list for SmartSuite for Windows 9.8 and fix packs
 Getting Smartsuite running under Vista64 

SmartSuite
SmartSuite
Lotus SmartSuite
Office suites for Windows
Office suites